Upper Sandusky is a city and the county seat of Wyandot County, Ohio, United States, along the upper Sandusky River, which flows north to Sandusky Bay and Lake Erie. The city is approximately 59 mi (96 km) south of Toledo and 62 mi (99 km) north of Columbus. The population was 6,596 at the 2010 census.  The city was founded in 1843 and named for an earlier Wyandot Indian village of the same name, which was located nearby. It was named "Upper" because it is located near the headwaters of the Sandusky River.

History

Upper Sandusky was a 19th-century Wyandot town named for its location at the headwaters of the Sandusky River in northwestern Ohio. This was the primary Wyandot town during the American Revolutionary War (1775–1783), and was sometimes also known as Half-King's Town, after Dunquat, the Wyandot "Half-King". The town and the surrounding settlements, like Captain Pipe's Town, were closely allied with the British at Fort Detroit. During the Crawford expedition of 1782, Pennsylvania militiamen sought to destroy the town, but were defeated en route.

After the war, in September 1783, a number of Native Americans met at Upper Sandusky and formed the Western Confederacy, a confederation intended to resist U.S. expansion into the Northwest Territory. The Northwest Indian War followed.

In the War of 1812, the village became the site of Fort Feree (or Ferree) on a bluff over looking the flood plain of the Sandusky River The Fort was built in late 1812 by Pennsylvania militia led by Lieutenant Colonel Joel Ferree, by order of General William Henry Harrison.

Upper Sandusky became part of the Wyandot Grand Reserve in the Upper Sandusky River area created by the Treaty of Fort Meigs in 1817. Prior to that, it was in northwestern Ohio Indian country above the Greenville Treaty line of 1795. Numerous indigenous Wyandot kept their settlements here until 1842, when they were driven out under the Indian Removal Act of 1830 to what became Wyandotte County, Kansas.  A small community of free Black people also lived in the old village.

A new town of Upper Sandusky was platted nearby the forcibly abandoned Wyandot village in 1843 and the first colonizer's house was built in 1845.  The first building in town was the county jail in 1846.  It was designated as the seat of Wyandot County in 1848.

Geography
Upper Sandusky is located at  (40.829608, -83.279102).

Demographics

2010 census
As of the census of 2010, there were 6,596 people, 2,882 households, and 1,724 families residing in the city. The racial makeup of the city was 95.0% White, 0.3% African American, 0.2% Native American, 0.8% Asian, 2.6% from other races, and 1.2% from two or more races. Hispanic or Latino people of any race were 4.3% of the population.

There were 2,882 households, of which 28.1% had children under the age of 18 living with them, 42.3% were married couples living together, 13.1% had a female householder with no husband present, 4.5% had a male householder with no wife present, and 40.2% were non-families. 34.8% of all households were made up of individuals, and 17.1% had someone living alone who was 65 years of age or older. The average household size was 2.24 and the average family size was 2.83.

The median age in the city was 41 years. 22.7% of residents were under the age of 18; 7.6% were between the ages of 18 and 24; 24.2% were from 25 to 44; 25.3% were from 45 to 64; and 20.3% were 65 years of age or older. The gender makeup of the city was 46.9% male and 53.1% female.

2000 census
As of the census of 2000, there were 6,533 people, 2,744 households, and 1,682 families residing in the city. The population density was 1,246.2 people per square mile (481.4/km). There were 2,910 housing units at an average density of 555.1 per square mile (214.4/km). The racial makeup of the city was 97.15% White, 0.18% Black or African American, 0.09% Native American, 0.57% Asian, 1.45% from other races, and 0.55% from two or more races. Hispanic or Latino people of any race were 2.71% of the population.

There were 2,744 households, out of which 28.9% had children under the age of 18 living with them, 47.7% were married couples living together, 11.1% had a female householder with no husband present, and 38.7% were non-families. 33.8% of all households were made up of individuals, and 15.4% had someone living alone who was 65 years of age or older. The average household size was 2.28 and the average family size was 2.93.

In the city, the population was spread out, with 23.5% under the age of 18, 8.3% from 18 to 24, 26.6% from 25 to 44, 21.7% from 45 to 64, and 19.9% who were 65 years of age or older. The median age was 39 years. For every 100 females, there were 86.5 males. For every 100 females age 18 and over, there were 82.2 males.

The median income for a household in the city was $35,613, and the median income for a family was $45,236. Males had a median income of $29,829 versus $22,526 for females. The per capita income for the city was $17,484. About 2.7% of families and 4.7% of the population were below the poverty line, including 4.5% of those under age 18 and 3.2% of those age 65 or over.

Education

Public Schools
Upper Sandusky Exempted Village School District operates three elementary schools, one middle school, and Upper Sandusky High School.

Public Library
The city has a lending library, the Upper Sandusky Community Library.

Supremacist Home Schooling Incident

In 2023, it was discovered that Upper Sandusky was home to a group promulgating a White supremacy and Nazi home schooling curriculum. As of February 2023 the incident is under investigation.

Notable people 
Neil Armstrong - first person to walk on the Moon; raised in Upper Sandusky
Jon Diebler - professional basketball player
Carl Karcher - founder of Carl's Jr. Restaurants (Hardee's)
Nate Reinking - American-British professional basketball player
Bob Schnelker - professional football player (Cleveland Browns, Philadelphia Eagles, New York Giants)

References
Tanner, Helen Hornbeck, ed. Atlas of Great Lakes Indian History. Norman: University of Oklahoma Press, 1987. .

External links

 City website

County seats in Ohio
Cities in Wyandot County, Ohio
Cities in Ohio
1845 establishments in Ohio